Kleveland is a surname. Notable people with the surname include:

Åse Kleveland (born 1949), Norwegian singer, guitarist, politician and activist
Kathrine Kleveland (born 1966), Norwegian politician
Marcus Kleveland (born 1999), Norwegian snowboarder

See also
Cleveland (surname)

Norwegian-language surnames